F42 may refer to:

 F42 (classification), a disability sport classification
 F-42 (Michigan county highway)
 , a Niterói-class frigate of the Brazilian Navy
 , a Cunard ocean liner requisitioned for the Royal Navy
 , a Leander-class frigate of the Royal Navy
 , a Nilgiri-class frigate of the Indian Navy
 Obsessive-compulsive disorder
 Samsung Galaxy F42 5G, a smartphone